4-Vinylphenol is an organic compound with the formula C2H3C6H4OH.  It is the most studied of the three isomeric vinylphenols. It is a white volatile solid.

Production
Upon contact with iron oxide at 500 °C,  4-ethylphenol undergoes dehydrogenation to give 4-vinyllphenol:
C2H5C6H4OH  →  C2H3C6H4OH  +  H2

Natural occurrence
It is found in wine and beer. It is produced by the spoilage yeast Brettanomyces. When it reaches concentrations greater than the sensory threshold, it can give the wine aromas described as barnyard, medicinal, band-aids, and mousy. In wine, 4-vinylphenol can react with other molecules, such as anthocyanidins, to produce new chemical compounds. In white wines vinylphenols are dominant (4-vinylphenol 70-1 150 μg/L, 4-vinylguaiacol 10-490 μg/L) whereas, in red wines, it is the corresponding ethyl phenols.

Biosynthesis

The enzyme cinnamate decarboxylase converts p-coumaric acid to 4-vinylphenol. 4-Vinylphenol is further reduced to 4-ethylphenol by the enzyme vinyl phenol reductase. Coumaric acid is sometimes added to microbiological media, enabling the positive identification of Brettanomyces by smell.

See also 
 4-Ethylguaiacol
 Yeast in winemaking
 Wine fault
 Wine chemistry
 Poly-4-vinylphenol (polyvinylphenol or PVP) is a plastic structurally similar to polystyrene.

References 

Natural phenols
Vinyl compounds